Sitara is an Indian Bengali-language film directed by Ashis Roy and based on novel Bhorer Proshuti by Abul Bashar. Produced by Siva prasad Pradhan under the Shivani Entertainment banner, the film stars Nassar as the title Raima Sen. The film focuses on Sitara, as a poor Bangladeshi housewife who crossed the border to enter the Indian lands illegally. It was released on 19 July 2019.

Plot 
Sitara is a poor Bangladeshi housewife who crossed the border to enter the Indian lands illegally, with her husband Jiban Sheikh. Jiban sold Sitara to Kabir, a notorious smuggler of ladies' and gents' pants, in order to earn bread by smuggling garments from Bangladesh. Sitara's father and brother also supported Jiban for their own selfish motives. Sitara found herself trapped and in deep hatred for her own people. This led her to accept herself as the ladies' and gents' pants queen. She soon established herself in the trade by offering her youth to the traders, agents, police officers and the security forces officers of both the countries.  Dilu, a poor Bangladeshi, who accompanied Sitara and Jiban had arrived with his mentally challenged sister. Jiban had appointed Dilu to look after his wife but Dilu soon fell in love with her. Although he could not never gather enough courage to confess his love, he tried hard to dissuade Sitara from doing such a risky job, but all went in vain.  Sitara rising to fame as the queen of ladies' and gents' pants came with a cost.  Various diseases began to leech off of her and left her alone, frail and penniless. Even her husband who pushed her to this state soon divorced her after she fell ill. Only Dilu who had lost his sister by this time stood beside Sitara. But, she pushed him away as she did not want to spoil his life. After these times of turmoil Sitara's health recovered but her position in the ladies' and gents' pants business could not be regained.  Meanwhile, Sitara met Manab, a social worker fighting for the rights of the poor people living in the border area. Sitara joined him and revoked the local people to rise up against the administration and local mafias. Sitara eventually fell in love with Manab and led him to success. Like others Manab too abandoned her after becoming an M.L.A. and went ahead to marry a rich woman from Kolkata. Sitara's plight to earn a living continued.

Cast
 Nassar as Kabir Mahajan
 Raima Sen as Sitara
 Subrat Dutta as Manab Sarkar 
 Meghna Naidu as Laxmana
 Zahid Hasan as Dilu
 Fazlur Rahman Babu as Jibon Bepari
 Masood Akhter as Doctor Mallick
 Parthasarathi Deb as Ananda Mahajan
 Ratan Sarkhel as Nimu
 Shahed Ali as Milan
 Noirata Majumder as Noyna
 Chandan Ghosh as Mantu Daroga
 Deepak Halder as Foni
 Mousami Sen as Mahajan's wife
 Shyamal Roychowdhury as Amal
 Hari Sadhan Chatterjee as Bagha Sekhi
 Kolika Majumder as Mokhada
 Suma Dey Roy as Manab's wife

Production

Casting and development
The project was earlier announced in September 2016.

Filming
Pre-production of the film started in August 2017. Principal photography of the film started in 1 February week, 2018, at Indo-Bengal border area Mekhliganj of Cooch Behar district.

Release
It was theatrically released on 19 July 2019.

Music 

Kalika Prasad Bhattacharya & Emon Saha composed the music, and Kalika Prasad Bhattacharya, Tarik Tuhin, wrote the lyrics.
Officially launched the music on 15 January 2019 at Hard Rock cafe, Park Street, Kolkata.

References

External links
 

Bengali-language Indian films
2010s Bengali-language films
2019 drama films
Indian drama films
Films set in West Bengal
2019 films